Mbemba is a Congolese name and might refer to:

Afonso I of Kongo, aka Nzinga Mbemba, King of Kongo (1509–1543)
Chancel Mbemba (born 1994), Congolese footballer
Jean-Martin Mbemba (born 1942), Congolese politician
Mbemba Sylla (born 1982), Guinean footballer
Nolan Mbemba (born 1995), French footballer
Pedro VI of Kongo, aka Mbemba, King of Kongo (1896–1910)
Pieter Mbemba (born 1988), Belgian footballer
Rudy Mbemba (born 1987), Swedish basketball player
Théophile Mbemba Fundu, Congolese politician
Surnames of Congolese origin